Ryongho station is a small railway station in Ryongho-ri, Ryonggang county, South P'yŏngan province, North Korea, on the Ryonggang Line of the Korean State Railway. A local passenger train, 733/734, operating between Mayŏng on the Ryonggang Line and Kangsŏ on the P'yŏngnam Line, stops at this station.

References

Railway stations in North Korea